Mad Mouse is a steel wild mouse roller coaster located at Valleyfair in Shakopee, Minnesota, U.S. It was manufactured by Arrow Dynamics and opened on May 8, 1999 as a replacement for the similar coaster Rails, which was eventually moved to Jolly Roger Amusement Park in Maryland in 1998. The ride's track and supports were designed by Ride Centerline.

References

Wild Mouse roller coasters
Valleyfair
Roller coasters in Minnesota